Dmitri Aleksandrovich Sesyavin (born 2 June 2001) is a Russian football player.

Club career
He made his debut for the main squad of FC Rotor Volgograd on 21 October 2020 in a Russian Cup game against PFC Krylia Sovetov Samara.

References

External links
 
 

2001 births
Living people
Russian footballers
Association football midfielders
FC Rotor Volgograd players
FC Olimpia Volgograd players